Timothy Berrett (born January 23, 1965 in Royal Tunbridge Wells, Kent, United Kingdom) is a male race walker. He came to Canada in 1987.  A resident of Edmonton, Alberta, he represented Canada in five consecutive Summer Olympics starting in 1992 (Barcelona, Spain). He competed in the 2008 Beijing Olympics at the 50 km walk event, finishing in 38th place with a time of 4:08:08. He was born in Tunbridge Wells, Kent, United Kingdom.

Berrett completed his Ph.D. degree at the University of Alberta, having completed master's degrees in economics and public administration at Queen's University and his undergraduate studies at the Brasenose College, Oxford.

In 2007 at Osaka, he competed in his ninth IAAF Athletics World Championships, a world record for a male track and field athlete, equaled by Spanish race-walker Jesús Ángel García and Jamaican hurdler Danny McFarlane in the 2009 World Championships in Athletics (Berlin).

Berrett is married to former field hockey international Tara Croxford, who also competed at the Barcelona Games for her native country.

Personal bests
20 km: 1:21:46 hrs –  Victoria, British Columbia, 13 August 2000
50 km: 3:50:21 hrs –  Tijuana, 21 March 2004

Achievements

See also
 Canadian records in track and field

References

External links

Timothy Berrett (Overview in Canadian Olympic Committee's web)
sports-reference
Tilastopaja biography

1965 births
Living people
Alumni of Brasenose College, Oxford
Athletes from Edmonton
Athletes (track and field) at the 1994 Commonwealth Games
Athletes (track and field) at the 1998 Commonwealth Games
Athletes (track and field) at the 2002 Commonwealth Games
Athletes (track and field) at the 2006 Commonwealth Games
Athletes (track and field) at the 1995 Pan American Games
Athletes (track and field) at the 1999 Pan American Games
Athletes (track and field) at the 1992 Summer Olympics
Athletes (track and field) at the 1996 Summer Olympics
Athletes (track and field) at the 2000 Summer Olympics
Athletes (track and field) at the 2004 Summer Olympics
Athletes (track and field) at the 2008 Summer Olympics
Canadian male racewalkers
English emigrants to Canada
Olympic track and field athletes of Canada
Queen's University at Kingston alumni
Pan American Games track and field athletes for Canada
Commonwealth Games medallists in athletics
Commonwealth Games silver medallists for Canada
Commonwealth Games bronze medallists for Canada
Medallists at the 1994 Commonwealth Games
Medallists at the 2002 Commonwealth Games